Lomatium farinosum, with the common name northern biscuitroot, is a perennial flowering herb of the family Apiaceae.

It is endemic to the Northwestern United States.

References

External links
  USDA Plants Profile for Lomatium farinosum (northern biscuitroot)

farinosum
Flora of the Northwestern United States
Endemic flora of the United States
Taxa named by John Merle Coulter
Flora without expected TNC conservation status